A chocolatier is a person or company who makes confectionery from chocolate.  Chocolatiers are distinct from chocolate makers, who create chocolate from cacao beans and other ingredients.

Education and training

Traditionally, chocolatiers, especially in Europe, trained through an apprenticeship with other chocolatiers.  It is now equally common for chocolatiers to start out as pastry or confectionery chefs, or attend culinary training specifically for working with chocolate.  Being a master chocolatier involves perfecting the art of working with chocolate to create desserts as well as skillfully crafted pieces of art with chocolate. Chocolatiers must understand the physical and chemical aspects of chocolate, to not only create chocolates and other confections, but also to create sculptures and centrepieces.  Perfecting the technical aspects of design and developing the art of flavor takes many years of practice.

Culinary schools
There are a variety of culinary schools and specialty chocolate schools, including the Ecole Chocolat Professional School of Chocolate Arts in Canada, and The Chocolate Academy, with twelve schools worldwide. The French Culinary Institute offers pastry and confectionery courses that are said to help a chocolatier learn the trade.

Programs of study at such institutions can include topics like:
 the history of chocolate
 modern techniques of cultivation and processing
 the chemistry of chocolate's flavors and textures
 chocolate tempering, dipping, decorating, and molding
 confectionery formulae based on ganache and/or fondant
 business management skills including marketing and production

Competitions

Once a chocolatier has mastered the artistry of chocolate, they may be considered a Master Chocolatier. The best of these compete in The World Chocolate Masters, a chocolate competition that started in 2005. Leading chocolatiers include Naomi Mizuno (Japan), Francisco Torreblanca (Spain), Pierre Marcolini, Yvonnick Le Maux (France), and Carmelo Sciampagna (Italy). Mizuno won the World Chocolate Masters competition in 2007. The competition was judged in four different categories: molded pralines, hand-dipped pralines, gastronomic chocolate dessert, small chocolate showpiece, and creative chocolate showpiece. At 28, Mizuno was the youngest competitor from his nation. He is employed at Futaba Pastry.

Techniques
 Tempering: Tempering chocolate involves heating and cooling the chocolate to result in desired characteristics like shininess of the chocolate or 'snap', the way it breaks. Chocolate contains cocoa butter which crystallizes during the heat treatment of melting and tempering chocolate. Heating the chocolate at certain temperatures, around 86-90 °F (30-32 °C), for specific periods of time and then cooling the chocolate and working with it in alternating segments is referred to as tempering. 
Molding: Molding is a design technique used in making chocolate pieces that are of a certain shape by taking liquid chocolate and pouring it into a mold and letting it harden.
Sculpting: Sculpting involves using chocolate to create a piece of artwork. Sculpting may involve using molds and pieces of chocolate, and decorating the piece with designs in chocolate.

See also

 Candy making
 List of chocolatiers

References

External links 

 A reference to terms used by Chocolatiers

 
Artisans
Chocolate